Kurskaya is a rural locality (a stanitsa) and the administrative center of Kursky District, Stavropol Krai, Russia. Population:

References

Notes

Sources

Rural localities in Stavropol Krai